The 2021–22 season was F.C. Motagua's 75th season in existence and the club's 56th consecutive season in the top fight of Honduran football.  In addition to the domestic league, the club also competed in the 2021 CONCACAF League and the 2022 CONCACAF Champions League.

Overview
Coach Diego Vásquez renewed his contract for one year and lead the team for his 16th consecutive tournament.  Due to poor results in both domestic and international fronts, he was sacked during the Clausura tournament.  He broke a league record of 350 consecutive games as manager.  He was temporarily recplaced by interim coach and former star César Obando and subsequently by Argentinian manager Hernán Medina, who mnaged to win the Clausura title.

Kits
The 2021–22 home, away and third kits were published on 15 July.

Players

Transfers in

Transfers out

Squad
 Statistics as of 29 May 2022
 Only league matches into account

Goalkeeper's action
 As of 29 May 2022

International caps
 As of 13 June 2022
This is a list of players that were playing for Motagua during the 2021–22 season and were called to represent Honduras at different international competitions.

Results
All times are local CST unless stated otherwise

Preseason and friendlies

Apertura

Clausura

CONCACAF League

CONCACAF Champions League

Statistics
 As of 29 May 2022

References

External links
 Official website

F.C. Motagua seasons
Motagua
Motagua